The 2017 Blossom Cup was a professional tennis tournament played on outdoor hard courts. It was the ninth edition of the tournament and part of the 2017 ITF Women's Circuit, offering a total of $60,000 in prize money. It took place in Quanzhou, China, from 27 March–2 April 2017.

Singles main draw entrants

Seeds 

 1 Rankings as of 20 March 2017

Other entrants 
The following player received a wildcard into the singles main draw:
  Wang Lixin

The following players received entry from the qualifying draw:
  Chen Jiahui
  Miyabi Inoue
  Jiang Xinyu
  Mai Minokoshi

Champions

Singles

 Zheng Saisai def.  Liu Fangzhou, 6–2, 6–3

Doubles

 Han Xinyun /  Ye Qiuyu def.  Hiroko Kuwata /  Zhu Lin, 6–3, 6–3

External links 
 2017 Blossom Cup at ITFtennis.com

2017 in Chinese sport
2017 ITF Women's Circuit
Industrial Bank Cup